This list of honorary doctors of the Norwegian University of Science and Technology (NTNU) shows recipients of honorary doctorates bestowed by NTNU and its precursors, the Norwegian Institute of Technology (NTH) (1910–1967) and the University of Trondheim (UNiT) (1968–1996). The first honorary doctorates, at NTH, were granted in 1935.

2021

 Toru H. Okabe, Japan
Gilbert Laporte, Canada
Paul D.N. Hebert, Canada

2020 - postponed due to the COVID-19 pandemic

2019

 Vishantie Sewpaul, South Africa

2018
 Jean-Marc Triscone, Italy
James E. Young, United States

2017
 Charis Thompson, United States
 Kristina Edström, Sweden
 Robert Jackson, Great Britain and Sweden (visiting professor)
2016
 Artemis Alexiadou, Greece
 Ottoline Leyser, Great Britain
 Michael Marmot, Great Britain
 Miguel Rubi, Spain

2015
 Elmgreen & Dragset, Denmark & Norway
 Susan L. Cutter, United States
 Bruce Beutler, United States

2014
Suresh Raj Sharma, Nepal
Donald Sadoway, United States

2013
Sergio Paoletti, Italy

2012
Donald Glenn Byrne, Australia
Jens Norskov, Denmark

2011
Eric Kandel, United States
Kjetil Trædal Thorsen, Norway

2010
Chick Corea, United States
Ingrid Daubechies, United States
Ilkka Hanski, Finland
Anne-Sophie Mutter, Germany
Preben Terndrup Pedersen, Denmark

2009
Piers Blaikie, United States
Thomas J.R. Hughes, United States

2008
Fred Kavli, United States
Elinor Ostrom, United States

2007
David Embury, Canada

2006
Liv Ullmann, Norway
Hans Mooij, Netherlands

2005
Chris Jenks, Great Britain

2004
Elizabeth Barrett-Connor, United States
Claus Michael Ringel, Germany

2003
Carmen Andrade, Spania
Jon Elster, Norway

2002
Suzanne Lacasse, United States
Toril Moi, Norway
Yuki Ueda, Japan

2001
Joseph V. Bonventre, United States
David Hendry, Great Britain
Hiroyuki Yoshikawa, Japan

2000
David Mumford, United States

1998
Thomas Luckmann, United States

1997
Liv Hatle, Norway
Frederick William Gehring, United States
Torsten Hägerstrand, Sweden
Karl Stenstadvold, Norway
Jürgen Warnatz, Germany

1996
Raymond Ian Page, Great Britain
Arve Tellefsen, Norway

1995
Helmer Dahl, Norway

1994
Robert Glaser, United States
Mats Hillert, Sweden

1993
Vigdís Finnbogadóttir, Iceland
Knut Schmidt-Nielsen, United States
Marshall B. Stranding, United States
Ernst H. Beutner, United States

1992
Walter Eversheim, Germany
K. Alex Müller
Nick Newman, United States
Kenneth W. Hedberg
Robert Ader

1985
Ivar Giæver, Norway
Edwin N. Lightfoot, Jr., United States
Olgierd Zienkiewicz, Spain

1982
James William Fulbright, United States
James Hamilton, Denmark
Lars von Haartman, Finland
John W. Kanwisher, United States
Lars Y. Terenius, Sweden
Gunnar Kullerud, United States
Olof E. H. Rydbeck, Sweden
Ray William Clough, United States

1976
Theodore Theodorsen, United States

1972
John H. Argyris, Germany
Aage Bohr, Denmark
Matts Bäckstrøm, Sweden
Cornelis Jacobus Gorter, Netherlands
Knud Grue-Sørensen, Denmark
Einar Ingvald Haugen, United States
Lipke Bijdeley Holthuis, Netherlands
Knud Winstrup Johansen, Denmark
Ralph Kronig, Netherlands
Atle Selberg, United States

1960
Alvar Aalto, Finland
Anker Engelund, Denmark
Ragnar Lundholm, Sweden
Lars Onsager, United States
Paul Scherrer, Switzerland
Frank Whittle, Great Britain
Ragnar Woxén, Sweden

1935
Ragnar Liljeblad, Sweden
Ludwig Prandtl, Germany
Raymond Unwin, United States

References

External links 
 NTNU's list of honorary doctors

Lists of honorary degree recipients
Honorary
Norwegian University of Science and Technology
Norway education-related lists